The Saint Kitts and Nevis national athletics team represents Saint Kitts and Nevis at the international athletics competitions such as Olympic Games or World Athletics Championships.

Medal count
Saint Kitts and Nevis has 5 participations in the Summer Olympic of 27 editions held from 1896 to 2012.

See also
Saint Kitts and Nevis at the Olympics
Saint Kitts and Nevis records in athletics
Athletics Summer Olympics medal table
World Championships medal table

References

External links
Kitts and Nevis Athletics at Summer Olympics

National team
Athletics
Saint Kitts